Drosophila statzi is an extinct species of flies, belonging to the family Drosophilidae. It is from the Upper Oligocene of the Rott Formation in Germany.

The name Drosophila elegans Bock and Wheeler, 1972, though a junior synonym, is used for an extant species found in Taiwan and the Philippines but the International Commission on Zoological Nomenclature ruled for the name to be conserved for the extant species of fruit fly by suppression of its unused senior homonym (replaced by †Drosophila statzi (Statz, 1940) Ashburner and Bachli, 2004).

See also 
 List of Drosophila species

References

External links 

 
 
 Drosophila elegans at insectoid.info

statzi
Fossils of Germany
Oligocene insects
Oligocene animals of Europe
Fossil taxa described in 1940